Mike Blabac (born January 18, 1974) is an ice sledge hockey player from United States who has competed at the Winter Paralympics. He plays as a goaltender. Blabac was diagnosed with multiple sclerosis in 2001.

In 2008 he played for the United States as they won third-place in the World Sledge Hockey Challenge.

He took part in the 2010 Winter Paralympics in Vancouver, where USA won gold. They beat Japan 2–0 in the final.

References

External links 
 
 

1974 births
Living people
American sledge hockey players
Paralympic sledge hockey players of the United States
Paralympic gold medalists for the United States
Ice sledge hockey players at the 2010 Winter Paralympics
Medalists at the 2010 Winter Paralympics
Paralympic medalists in sledge hockey
21st-century American people